Safavī (adjective meaning related to Safī) may refer to the following:
Safavid dynasty which ruled Iran in 16th and 17th centuries
Safavi (surname) which is the surname of members of the Safavid dynasty and their descendants.
Safaviya, a Sufi order founded by Safi-ad-din Ardabili
Navvab Safavi, a militant Iranian cleric and the founder of Feda'iyan-e Islam
Yahya Rahim Safavi, a commander of the Iranian Revolutionary Guards

See also
Safavi (surname)